"For You" is a song by English band Electronic, comprising Bernard Sumner and Johnny Marr, with guesting co-writer Karl Bartos of Kraftwerk, released as the second single from their second album Raise the Pressure. "For You" reached #16 on the UK Singles Chart.

Single
As was the trend in the 1990s, it was issued as two Compact Discs as well as on cassette. The first CD featured two exclusive B-sides ("I Feel Alright" and "All That I Need"), while the second had three previously released tracks from the period of their first album Electronic (the 12" remix of "Get the Message, its B-side "Free Will", and "Disappointed"). In Europe only the first CD was released.

Versions
"I Feel Alright", also written with Bartos, remains commercially unavailable, although the Marr-Sumner track "All That I Need" was included on the Japanese issue of Raise the Pressure and the 2006 compilation Get the Message – The Best of Electronic. The album version of "For You" was also included on this collection.

A UK 1-track promo CD featured a shorter edit than the single and album versions, and soundtracked its music video directed by Richard Heslop.

Track listings

UK CD1/EU CD
 "For You"
 "All That I Need"
 "I Feel Alright"

UK CD2
 "For You"
 "Free Will" (12" mix)
 "Disappointed"
 "Get the Message" (DNA Mix)

UK MC
 "For You"
 "All That I Need"

UK promo CD
 "For You" (radio edit)

External links
 feel every beat (unofficial website)
 worldinmotion.net (unofficial website)

1996 singles
1996 songs
Electronic (band) songs
Music videos directed by Richard Heslop
Parlophone singles
Songs written by Bernard Sumner
Songs written by Johnny Marr
Songs written by Karl Bartos